Chebsaurus is a genus of quadrupedal, herbivorous, cetiosaurid sauropod dinosaur, specifically a eusauropod. It lived in present-day Algeria, in the Callovian aged Aïssa Formation. The type species, C. algeriensis, was named in 2005 by Mahammed et al. and is the most complete Algerian sauropod known.

The word "Cheb" "شاب" is colloquial Arabic for "young man", as the fossils found were believed to be from a juvenile. The original publication, by Mahammed et al., gives Chebsaurus the nickname "the Giant of Ksour". A second skeleton, also from a juvenile of a similar ontogenetic stage, is also known.

Both skeletons, including cranial material, was found in the Ksour Mountains, part of the Occidental Saharan Atlas (Algerian High Atlas).

References

Further reading 
 Original paper, in English and French

Cetiosauridae
Middle Jurassic dinosaurs of Africa
Fossils of Algeria
Fossil taxa described in 2005